Séquences  is a French-language film magazine originally published in Montreal, Quebec by the Commission des ciné-clubs du Centre catholique du cinéma de Montréal, a Roman Catholic film society. It is the third oldest French film magazine in publication after Les Cahiers du cinéma and Positif.

History and profile
Séquences was founded in 1955. The publication was edited for forty years by Léo Bonneville, a member of the Clerics of Saint Viator and Quebec film scholar. In 2009 the website of the magazine was launched. Élie Castiel is the editor of Séquences.

See also
Ciné-Bulles
24 images
 List of film periodicals

References

External links
Séquences website

1955 establishments in Quebec
Film magazines published in Canada
Monthly magazines published in Canada
Catholic magazines
Cinema of Quebec
French-language magazines published in Canada
Magazines established in 1955
Magazines published in Montreal